The 1987 Cal State Fullerton Titans football team represented California State University, Fullerton as a member of the Pacific Coast Athletic Association (PCAA) during the 1987 NCAA Division I-A football season. Led by eighth-year head coach Gene Murphy, Cal State Fullerton compiled an overall record of 6–6 with a mark of 4–3 in conference play, placing in a four-way tie for second in the PCAA. The Titans played their home games at Santa Ana Stadium in Santa Ana, California.

Schedule

Team players in the NFL
The following Cal State Fullerton players were selected in the 1988 NFL Draft.

References

Cal State Fullerton
Cal State Fullerton Titans football seasons
Cal State Fullerton Titans football